Richard Vaughan (born 28 July 1971) is a robotics and artificial intelligence researcher at Simon Fraser University in Canada.  Since 2018, Vaughan is on leave from SFU and is working at Apple. He is the founder and director of the SFU Autonomy Laboratory. In 1998, Vaughan demonstrated the first robot to interact with animals and in 2000 co-founded the Player Project, a robot control and simulation system.

References

1971 births
Living people
Canadian roboticists